Legkovo is a rural locality (a village) in Andreyevskoye Rural Settlement, Alexandrovsky District, Vladimir Oblast, Russia. The population was 357 as of 2010. There are 8 streets.

Geography 
Vyalkovka is the nearest rural locality.

References 

Rural localities in Alexandrovsky District, Vladimir Oblast